Mount Sir James MacBrien is a peak in the Fort Smith Region of Canada's Northwest Territories.  The second highest peak in the Mackenzie Mountains, it is named after Major-General Sir James Howden MacBrien who was the head of the Canadian Militia in the mid-1920s.

References

Sir James MacBrien
Nahanni National Park Reserve